Amphisbaena roberti is a species of worm lizard in the family Amphisbaenidae. The species is endemic to South America.

Etymology
The specific name, roberti, is in honor of German herpetologist Robert Mertens.

Geographic range
A. roberti is found in Brazil (Goiás, Minas Gerais, Paraná, São Paulo) and Paraguay.

Reproduction
A. roberti is oviparous.

References

Further reading
Gans C (1964). "The South American species of Amphisbaena with a vertically keeled tail (Reptilia, Amphisbaenidae)". Senckenbergiana biologica 45 (3/5): 387–416. (Amphisbaena roberti, new species).
Mott T, Vieites DR (2009). "Molecular phylogenetics reveals extreme morphological homoplasy in Brazilian worm lizards challenging current taxonomy". Molecular Phylogenetics and Evolution 51 (2): 190–200.
Vanzolini PE (1992). "Cercolophia, a new genus for the species of Amphisbaenia with a terminal vertical keel on the tail (Reptilia, Amphisbaenia)". Papéis Avulsos de Zoologia, Museu de Zoologia da Universidade de São Paulo 37 (27): 401–412. (Cercolophia roberti, new combination).

roberti
Reptiles described in 1964
Taxa named by Carl Gans